The Expression is the debut studio album by Australian pop rock, new wave group The Expression. The album peaked at No. 55 on the Kent Music Report Albums Chart.

Track listing

Charts

References 

1983 debut albums
Mushroom Records albums
The Expression albums